Frederick Robson (25 April 1885 – 3 November 1952) was an English professional golfer who played in the early 20th century. Robson was a frequent competitor in the Open Championship.  His best performance was a tie for second with Aubrey Boomer in the 1927 Open Championship.

Early life
Robson was born in Shotton, Flintshire, Wales, on 25 April 1885.

Golf career
Robson was involved in a dispute about which team he would represent in the 1909 England–Scotland Professional Match. He apparently had a Scottish father and English mother and was initially selected for both sides. Having learnt his golf in England he eventually chose to represent that country. A meeting of the PGA on the following Monday accepted the principle that the player could choose in such situations.
However this account is contradicted by the 1891 census of Wales which records that his father was born in Birmingham and mother in Holywell.

1927 Open Championship
The 1927 Open Championship was the 62nd Open Championship, held 13–15 July at the Old Course at St Andrews in St Andrews, Scotland. Amateur Bobby Jones successfully defended the title with a dominating six stroke victory, the second of his three victories at the Open Championship. Robson carded rounds of  76-72-69-74=291 and finished in second place, tied with Aubrey Boomer. He and Boomer each won £62 10s in prize money.

Robson also played on the three Great Britain Ryder Cup teams in 1927, 1929, and 1931.

Death and legacy
Robson died on 3 November 1952 in Croydon, London, England, at the age of 67. Robson is best remembered for his numerous starts in the Open Championship, the best of which was a second-place finish in 1927. He was also a Ryder Cup player.

Tournament wins
Note: This list may be incomplete
1911 Southern Professional Foursomes Tournament (with Tom Ball)
1924 Yorkshire Evening News Tournament
1939 True Temper Foursomes Tournament (with Dick Burton)

Results in major championships

Note: Robson only played in The Open Championship.

NT = No tournament
WD = withdrew
CUT = missed the half-way cut
"T" indicates a tie for a place

Team appearances
England–Scotland Professional Match (representing England): 1909 (winners), 1910 (winners)
Coronation Match (representing the Professionals): 1911 (winners)
Great Britain vs USA (representing Great Britain): 1926 (winners)
Ryder Cup (representing Great Britain): 1927, 1929 (winners), 1931
Seniors vs Juniors (representing the Seniors): 1928 (winners)

References

English male golfers
Ryder Cup competitors for Europe
People from Shotton, Flintshire
Sportspeople from Flintshire
1885 births
1952 deaths